Albert Reilly may refer to:

 E. Albert Reilly, lawyer and politician
Albert Reilly; see List of Spider-Man supporting characters